The Aziz Bhatti Park is located near Federal Urdu University on University Road in Gulshan-e-Iqbal, Karachi, Sindh, Pakistan.
 
The Park named after Major Aziz Bhatti of Punjab Regiment, Pakistan Army. He defended Burki sector of Lahore on 6 September 1965, against an Indian attack during the Indo-Pakistani War of 1965.

The Aziz Bhatti Park was developed in 1972 by Karachi Development Authority and handed over to Karachi Metropolitan Corporation in 1992. The park has 37 acres land but only 7 to 8 acres area is developed as park and remaining is still plain ground. There is also a natural lake in park.

Gallery

See also 
 List of parks and gardens in Pakistan
 List of parks and gardens in Lahore
 List of parks and gardens in Karachi

References

Parks in Karachi